Tajik State University of Commerce is an economics university located in Dushanbe, Tajikistan.

Universities in Tajikistan
Education in Dushanbe